Tegenaria percuriosa is a funnel-web spider found in Bulgaria and Turkey.

See also 
 List of Agelenidae species

References

External links 

percuriosa
Spiders of Europe
Arthropods of Turkey
Spiders described in 1972